Edward Millman (January 1, 1907 – February 11, 1964) was an American painter. His work is in the permanent collections of the Museum of Modern Art, the Smithsonian American Art Museum, and the Whitney Museum of American Art.

References

1907 births
1964 deaths
American male painters
Artists from Chicago
School of the Art Institute of Chicago alumni
20th-century American painters
20th-century American male artists